Asllan Rusi (4 October 1944—1983) was a former Albanian volleyball player who played for Dinamo Tirana and the Albania men's national team. He is memorialized in the naming of the Asllan Rusi Sports Palace, Albania's main indoor sporting arena. He was a 12 time national champion and a 7 time cup winner in Albania and he earned 40 international caps with Albania.

References 

1944 births
1983 deaths
Sportspeople from Tirana
Albanian men's volleyball players